Inversion operator may refer to:
 Inversion operator, the operator that assigns the inverse element to an element of a group
 Inversion in a point
 Chromosomal inversion, the reordering of genes in a DNA-sequence

See also
Inversion (disambiguation)